Isaac Dashiell Jones (November 1, 1806 – July 5, 1893) was a U.S. Congressman from Maryland, serving from 1841 to 1843.

Early life
Isaac Dashiell Jones was born on the family homestead Wetipquin in Somerset County, Maryland to Priscilla and Benjamin Jones. Jones completed preparatory studies and graduated from Washington Academy, where he became assistant tutor before his studies were completed. He studied law, was admitted to the bar, and commenced practice in Princess Anne.

Career
Jones served as a member of the Maryland House of Delegates in 1832, 1834, 1840–1841, and 1867.

Jones was elected as a Whig from Maryland's 1st congressional district to the Twenty-seventh Congress, serving from March 4, 1841, to March 3, 1843. He took an active part in the Maryland constitutional conventions of 1864 and 1867, and was elected Attorney General of Maryland in 1867. He was later elected judge of the court of arbitration of Baltimore, Maryland, in 1877, and served as director of the Maryland School for the Deaf in Frederick, Maryland, from 1867 to 1893, and of the Maryland School for the Colored Blind and Deaf at Baltimore from 1872 to 1893.

Personal life
Jones married Eliza Hays.

Jones died in Baltimore on July 5, 1893, and is interred in Green Mount Cemetery.

References

External links

1806 births
1893 deaths
Maryland Attorneys General
People from Somerset County, Maryland
Whig Party members of the United States House of Representatives from Maryland
People from Princess Anne, Maryland
19th-century American politicians